The Hellenic Republic recognised the Republic of Estonia on May 19, 1922. Greece never recognised the Soviet annexation of Estonia. Both countries re-established diplomatic relations on October 2, 1991. In April 1997, Estonia has established an embassy in Athens. The Greek embassy in Tallinn opened in January 2005. Estonia has also 3 honorary consulates in Patras, Piraeus and Thessaloniki. Both countries are full members of NATO and the European Union.

List of bilateral visits

To Greece 
April 1997,  Estonian Minister of Foreign Affairs Toomas Hendrik Ilves
May 1999, President of Estonia Lennart Meri
June 2004, Estonian Minister of Foreign Affairs Kristiina Ojuland
June 2004, President of Estonia Arnold Rüütel and Estonian Minister of Culture Urmas Paet in relation with the Olympic Games
May 2008, Estonian Minister of Foreign Affairs Urmas Paet

To Estonia 
October 2000, President of Greece Konstantinos Stephanopoulos
May 2003, Prime Minister of Greece Costas Simitis (during the EU Presidency)

List of bilateral agreements

 Agreement on Cultural, Educational, and Scientific Cooperation (1999).
 Agreement on the Promotion and Mutual Protection of Investments (1997).
 Maritime Transport Agreement (1997).
 International passenger and goods transport agreement (1999).
 Memorandum of bilateral Economic cooperation (1999).
 Cooperation agreement in respect of Tourism (1999).

Diplomacy
The Republic of Estonia has an embassay in Athens. The Republic of Greece has an embassy in Tallinn.

See also 
Foreign relations of Estonia
Foreign relations of Greece
Greeks in Estonia
Greeks in Europe
Estonians in Greece
Estonians in Europe

External links
 Estonian Ministry of Foreign Affairs about the relations with Greece
 Estonian Ministry of Foreign Affairs: directions of honorary consulates in Greece
 Estonian embassy in Athens
Greek Ministry of Foreign Affairs about the relation with Estonia
Greek embassy in Tallinn

 
Greece
Estonia